United Working Families (UWF) is an independent political organization based in Chicago, Illinois. It was formed in 2014 as a coalition between the Chicago Teachers Union, SEIU Healthcare Illinois Indiana, Grassroots Illinois Action, and Action Now. Although it is not a formal political party, the organization recruits and trains political candidates and organizers, endorses and provides support to political candidates, and engages in community organizing. Its stated goal is to "create space for independent politics" in Chicago and Illinois and to enact a "vision for a city and a state that provides for the many, not just the wealthy few." The organization has been characterized as part of the progressive movement and the labor movement.

Electoral politics

Municipal elections

2015 Chicago municipal elections 
In 2015, UWF backed the candidacy of Jesus "Chuy" Garcia against incumbent mayor Rahm Emanuel. Garcia placed second in the first round and proceeded to the run-off election, where he lost to Emanuel.

The below table shows the candidates endorsed by UWF in the 2015 Chicago aldermanic election.

2019 Chicago municipal elections 
UWF did not make an endorsement in the 2019 mayoral election, but did create a digital advertisement featuring activists who critiqued candidate Lori Lightfoot for actions during her tenure as president of the Chicago Police Board. Lightfoot proceeded to win the election.

The below table shows the candidates endorsed by UWF in the 2019 Chicago aldermanic election. All endorsed candidates who won would later join the City Council's Progressive Reform Caucus.

2023 Chicago municipal elections 
In the 2023 Chicago mayoral election, UWF endorsed challenger Brandon Johnson, who is currently serving on the Cook County Board of Commissioners. Chuy García, who had received UWF's endorsement for Mayor in 2015, requested a delay in the endorsement process while he made his decision about whether to enter the race, but UWF proceeded with endorsing Johnson in September 2022, citing Garcia's unwillingness to provide a timeline for his decision.

The below table shows candidates endorsed by UWF in the 2023 Chicago aldermanic election.

State and county elections

2018 Illinois and Cook County elections 
UWF endorsed the following candidates in the 2018 Illinois elections:

2020 Illinois and Cook County elections 
The below table shows candidates endorsed by UWF in the 2020 Illinois elections. The organization also endorsed Bernie Sanders in the Democratic Party presidential primary election.

2022 Illinois and Cook County elections 
The below table shows candidates endorsed by UWF in the 2022 Illinois elections and 2022 Cook County elections.

Policy agenda 
In May 2019, all UWF-endorsed candidates who won in the 2019 Chicago aldermanic election (along with alderman Daniel La Spata) signed onto a legislative policy agenda entitled "Our 100 Day Plan to Reimagine Chicago." The agenda includes ordinances supporting public housing and affordable housing, a new real estate transfer tax, an increased minimum wage, a Community Benefits Agreement for the Obama Presidential Center, eliminating exemptions in Chicago's welcoming city ordinance, and reform of tax increment financing.

In November 2019, aldermen affiliated with UWF hosted a series of town halls on the city budget, in support of their proposed alternatives to Mayor Lightfoot's budget. The organization itself released a statement opposing the mayor's budget on the grounds that it lacked funding for affordable housing, failed to re-open closed mental health clinics, and did not contain sufficient progressive revenue measures. On November 26, eight of the nine UWF-endorsed aldermen voted against Lightfoot's budget proposal, which passed by a vote of 39–11.

During the COVID-19 pandemic, UWF worked with other community organizations and some local elected officials to create and endorse a "Right to Recovery" package at the city, county, and state levels. The package would include paid emergency leave, emergency housing for those unable to self-quarantine, a moratorium on Immigration and Customs Enforcement check-ins, and weekly payments of $750 to families with children and workers facing layoffs and furloughs.

See also 

 Chicago City Council Progressive Reform Caucus

Notes

References 

Organizations based in Chicago